Anomima phaeochra is a nocturnal species of moth belonging to the genus Anomima and family Tineodidae. Anomima phaeohcra can be found throughout Australia. Anomima phaeochra was first described by naturalist Alfred Jefferis Turner in 1922 in Queensland, Australia.

References  

Tineodidae
Insects described in 1922
Insects of Australia
Taxa named by Alfred Jefferis Turner